The International Tennis Tournament of Messina (also known as Torneo Hamilton) was a tennis tournament held annually in Messina, Italy. Held for 12 editions in 1980s, the tournament was played on outdoor clay courts and was a part of the ATP Challenger Tour schedule from 1980 to 1991.

History
The tournament of Messina was part of ATP Challenger Tour circuit in 1980s.

Many important players have played in Messina, as Victor Pecci or Guillermo Pérez Roldán, that when won in Messina was number 15 in ATP world Rankings.

Editions

References

External links
 Past champions at ATP Tour
 Cinque gloriose manifestazioni sportive che non esistono più 

ATP Challenger Tour
Clay court tennis tournaments
Sports competitions in Messina
Tennis tournaments in Italy